Sarah Manners (born 25 August 1975) is an English actress and entrepreneur known for her roles in Casualty, Strictly Come Dancing, The Bill, Doctors and creating her Pilates app, Pilates On Tap.

Early and personal life
Manners was educated at King Edward VI Handsworth, Birmingham. She married computer salesman Ben O'Sullivan, in 2003 at Lickey, Worcestershire. Manners revealed in an interview that the two had divorced in 2009. She said, "We spent 10 years together and are still close. He's a lovely man".

Career
Manners began her career in 1997, appearing in one episode of the BBC soap opera EastEnders. In 2000, Manners received the role of Joanna Helm in the BBC soap opera Doctors. Of her role she said, "I got the best storylines in the world in Doctors, my nan died of a brain tumour then it came out I killed her. I went mad and was addicted to anti-depressants, forged signatures and tried to kill myself". She later went on to appear in K.C. Gregory in Sky One's Mile High and Bex Reynolds in the BBC medical drama Casualty. In 2004, it was announced that Manners was to participate in the second series of the BBC's Strictly Come Dancing. She was paired with dancer Brendan Cole and the pair finished in sixth place. She starred in a reconstruction for a documentary called True Crime Stories: Tracie Andrews – Blood on her hands. She played Tracie Andrews alongside James Daffern in 2002.

Manners appeared in ITV1's The Bill, as Kirsty Knight. After six months on-screen it was announced that the show was to be cancelled. Of this she said, "I’m heartbroken. Not just for myself, but for everyone on the show. It’s a real loss for the industry. Everyone is really upset about it". All the big wigs came down to break the news to us at a meeting. We knew straight away when we saw the look on their faces. But what can you do? C’est la vie! I’ve had a fabulous time and we’re trying to remain positive. We’ve enjoyed every last minute of filming and had a laugh. I'm proud to be part of the last cast of The Bill". Of her time on the show she said, "I loved all the action and the stunts on The Bill, and the subject matter – it’s a lot more serious than some of the TV I’ve done. In Casualty I had a rape storyline, but mainly I’ve been the light relief, so this has been a nice change".

Manners qualified as a Pilates instructor in 2014. In 2022 she designed and launched her Pilates app, Pilates On Tap. She was named an 'Inspirational Woman In Tech' by We Are Tech Women in December 2022.

Filmography

References
 https://wearetechwomen.com/inspirational-woman-sarah-manners-founder-pilates-on-tap/

External links
 

English television actresses
English soap opera actresses
Alumni of the Royal Central School of Speech and Drama
Actresses from Birmingham, West Midlands
1975 births
Living people
People educated at King Edward VI Handsworth